Charles Graham Ballantyne (30 August 1914 – 21 August 1991) was a Scottish footballer who played for Dumbarton and Clyde.

References

1914 births
1991 deaths
Scottish footballers
Dumbarton F.C. players
Clyde F.C. players
Scottish Football League players
Association football central defenders
Sportspeople from Dumbarton
Footballers from West Dunbartonshire